Luís Miguel da Fonseca Silva Costa (born 22 July 1971), known as Luís Miguel, is an Angolan former footballer who played as a right back, and a coach. He also held Portuguese citizenship.

Club career
Born in Luanda, Angola to Portuguese parents, Luís Miguel played nine seasons in the Portuguese Primeira Liga. He totalled 159 games and one goal in the competition, at the service of Sporting Clube de Portugal, S.C. Braga and F.C. Paços de Ferreira.

In the Segunda Liga, Luís Miguel appeared for C.D. Aves and F.C. Felgueiras, retiring in 2005 after 16 seasons as a professional at the age of 34. During his spell at the Estádio José Alvalade he took part in 52 competitive matches, his only goal arriving on 26 November 1997 in a 2–3 away loss against AS Monaco FC for the group stage of the UEFA Champions League.

In 2006, Luís Miguel started working as a manager, working solely in the Portuguese lower leagues.

International career
Luís Miguel represented Angola internationally. He was part of the squad that competed in the 1998 African Cup of Nations, starting as the tournament ended in group phase elimination.

Honours
Sporting
Supertaça Cândido de Oliveira: 1995

References

External links
 
 
 

1971 births
Living people
Portuguese sportspeople of Angolan descent
Footballers from Luanda
Portuguese footballers
Angolan footballers
Association football defenders
Primeira Liga players
Liga Portugal 2 players
Segunda Divisão players
Amarante F.C. players
C.D. Aves players
Sporting CP footballers
S.C. Braga players
S.C. Braga B players
F.C. Paços de Ferreira players
F.C. Felgueiras players
Angola international footballers
1998 African Cup of Nations players
Portuguese football managers
Angolan football managers
A.D. Lousada managers
G.D. Chaves managers